David Taylor (5 August 1884 – 6 August 1949) was a Scottish professional football player and manager. As a player he was a defender, and won the FA Cup in 1911 with Bradford City and in 1914 with Burnley.

Career
Moving from Rangers to Bradford City in September 1910, Taylor signed for Burnley in November 1911. With Bradford he won the 1911 FA Cup Final, and with Burnley he won the 1914 FA Cup Final and the 1920–21 Football League title. He was known for his pace.

Taylor guested for both Old Firm clubs during the First World War. He only featured for Celtic in five league matches but could be considered to have played an important part in their 1918–19 Scottish Football League title win, as in his debut on 1 January 1919 the Hoops held his old club Rangers to a 1–1 draw at Ibrox thanks to what was described in the press as "magnificent rearguard tactics", going on to win the championship from the same rivals by one point. At the end of that season, he suffered from serious heart trouble which put his career and health at risk, but was later able to continue with Burnley. 

He played in two Home Scots v Anglo-Scots international trials just prior to the war, but never gained a full cap for Scotland. 

He later moved back to Scotland to manage St Johnstone and Dunfermline Athletic, before returning to England to manage Carlisle United.

See also
Played for Celtic and Rangers

References

External links
BantamsPast.co.uk

1884 births
1949 deaths
Scottish footballers
Scottish football managers
Association football fullbacks
Association football central defenders
Motherwell F.C. players
Rangers F.C. players
Bradford City A.F.C. players
Burnley F.C. players
St Johnstone F.C. managers
Dunfermline Athletic F.C. managers
Carlisle United F.C. managers
Scottish Football League players
English Football League players
English Football League managers
Footballers from Stirling
Scottish Football League managers
Rangers F.C. wartime guest players
Celtic F.C. wartime guest players
Ashfield F.C. players
Ayr United F.C. wartime guest players
Chelsea F.C. wartime guest players
Falkirk F.C. wartime guest players
Blackburn Rovers F.C. non-playing staff
British Army personnel of World War I
Royal Army Service Corps soldiers

FA Cup Final players